This article lists the Diplomatic missions in Gabon. The capital Libreville hosts 36 embassies/high commissions.

Diplomatic missions in Libreville

Embassies/High Commissions 
Entries marked with an asterisk (*) are member-states of the Commonwealth of Nations. As such, their embassies are formally termed as "high commissions".

 
 
 
 
 *
 
 
 
 
 
 
 
 
 
 
 
 
 
 
 
 
 
 
 
 *
 
 
 
 
 *
 
 
 
 *

Other missions in Libreville
  (Delegation)

Non-resident embassies 
Resident in Abuja, Nigeria:
 
 
 
 
 
 
 
 
 
 
 
 

Resident in Kinshasa, Congo-Kinshasa:
 
 

 
 
 
 
 

Resident in Luanda, Angola:
 
 
 

Resident in Yaoundé, Cameroon:
 
 
  
 
 

Resident elsewhere:
 
  (Brazzaville)
  (New York)
  (Rabat)
  (Cotonou)
  (Cotonou)
  (São Tomé)
  (Dakar)
 (Rabat)
 (Addis Ababa)

Closed missions

See also 
 Foreign relations of Gabon
 List of diplomatic missions of Gabon

References 

 Liste Protocolaire des Ambassadeurs et Chargés d'Affaires accredités en République Gabonaise || Ministère des Affaires Etrangères, de la Francophonie et de l’Intégration Régionale Protocol list (in French)

Gabon
List
Diplomatic missions